The 2004–05 SpVgg Greuther Fürth season was the club's 102nd season in existence and the club's eighth consecutive season in the top flight of German football. In addition to the domestic league, SpVgg Greuther Fürth participated in this season's edition of the DFB-Pokal. The season covers the period from 1 July 2004 to 30 June 2005.

Pre-season and friendlies

Competitions

Overview

2. Bundesliga

League table

Results summary

Results by round

Matches

Source:

DFB-Pokal

References

External links

SpVgg Greuther Fürth seasons
SpVgg Greuther Fürth